I've Got the Cure is the eighth studio album by American singer Stephanie Mills, released on September 10, 1984 by Casablanca Records, her final release for the label. It features the single "The Medicine Song", which peaked at number one on the Billboard Dance Club Songs chart. The album peaked at No. 73 on the U.S. Billboard 200 and at No. 10 on the U.S. Billboard Top R&B/Hip-Hop Albums chart.

In 2013, the UK's Cherry Red Records reissued I've Got the Cure on their Soul Music Records imprint. This re-release is an expanded edition compact disc which includes "The Medicine Song" (Original Mark Berry 12" Mix), "Edge of the Razor" (Dance Mix) and "Edge of the Razor" (Dub Mix) as bonus tracks.

Four of the album's ten tracks - "Edge of the Razor", "Give it Half a Chance", "Outrageous" and "Everlasting Love" were produced by George Duke who also played on the album.

Track listing
Side one
"The Medicine Song" (David "Hawk" Wolinski) – 4:52 
"Edge of the Razor" (Tom Snow, Roy Freeland) – 4:56 
"In My Life" (Pat Leonard, Keithen Carter) – 4:06 
"Give it Half a Chance" (Kenny Loggins, Stephen Bishop) – 4:41

Side two
"Outrageous" (Len Ron Hanks, John Lewis Parker) – 4:50 
"You Might Just Need a Friend" (Pat Leonard, Keithen Carter) – 3:56 
"Everlasting Love" (Howard Grate, Michael Powell) – 4:23 
"Rough Trade" (Pat Leonard, Keithen Carter, David "Hawk" Wolinski) – 3:49 
"Undercover" (Pat Leonard, Keithen Carter) – 3:50

Bonus Tracks on 2013 SoulMusic Records Reissue
"The Medicine Song" (Mark Berry 12 Inch Mix) – 6:40
"Edge of the Razor" (Dance Mix) – 6:39
"Edge of the Razor" (Dub Mix) – 4:01

Personnel 
Credits are adapted from the I've Got the Cure liner notes.
 Stephanie Mills – lead vocals, backing vocals (1, 3, 5-9)
 David "Hawk" Wolinski – keyboards (1, 3, 6, 8, 9), synthesizer programming (1), guitars (1)
 George Duke – Memorymoog (2, 4, 5, 7), Moog bass (2), LinnDrum (2, 5), backing vocals (2, 4), Rhodes (4, 7), electric grand piano (5)
 Patrick Leonard – keyboards (3, 6, 8, 9), synthesizer programming (3, 6, 8, 9)
 Kevin Murphy – vocoder (8)
 Paul Jackson Jr. – guitars (2, 5)
 Bruce Gaitsch – guitars (3, 6, 8, 9)
 David T. Walker – guitars (7)
 Fred Washington – bass guitar (4, 7)
 John Robinson – drums (3, 4), Simmons drums (8, 9)
 Paulinho da Costa – percussion (4)
 Kim Hutchcroft – alto saxophone solo (2)
 Larry Williams – flute (4)
 George Del Barrio – string arrangements and conductor (4)
 Lynn Davis – backing vocals (2, 4)
 Marcy Levy – backing vocals (2, 4)
 Julia Waters – backing vocals (3, 6, 8)
 Maxine Waters – backing vocals (3, 6, 8)
 The Weather Girls – backing vocals (7)

Production 
 George Duke – producer, arrangements 
 Hawk Wolinski – co-producer (1, 3, 6, 8, 9)
 Stephanie Mills – executive producer
 Ivy Skoff – production assistant (1, 3, 6, 8, 9)
 Constance de Guzman – production assistant (2, 4, 5, 7)
 John Arrias – recording (1, 3, 6, 8, 9), mixing (1, 3, 6, 8, 9)
 Tommy Vicari – recording (2, 4, 5, 7), mixing (2, 4, 5, 7)
 David Luke – assistant engineer (2, 4, 5, 7)
 David Marquette – assistant engineer (2, 4, 5, 7)
 Nick Spigel – assistant engineer (2, 4, 5, 7)
 Glen Christensen – art direction, design 
 Ron Slenzak – photography 
 Glenn Parsons – lettering 
 Cassandra Mills – album concept, management 
 Allen Mills – management
 Starlight Music, Inc. – management

Studios
 Recorded at Fantasy Records (Berkeley, California); Soundcastle (Hollywood, California); Le Gonks West (West Hollywood, California); Cherokee Studios and Foot On The Hill (Los Angeles, California).

Charts

References

External links

1984 albums
Stephanie Mills albums
Casablanca Records albums
Hi-NRG albums